Jonathan Lacoste (born September 2, 1993) is an American internet entrepreneur, co founder of Jebbit Inc currently living in Boston, Massachusetts. In 2011, Lacoste along with classmate and friend Tom Coburn, co-founded Jebbit, an enterprise software company in the mobile marketing and consumer data space. Lacoste currently serves as the company's President and sits on the Board of Directors.

Early life and education

Lacoste was born and raised in Columbus, Ohio to John and Jane Lacoste along with two younger brothers, Joshua and Joel. He is the grandson of Réné Lacoste.  He received his high school diploma from St. Edward High School, a private, all-male Catholic, college-preparatory high school located in Cleveland, Ohio. Growing up, Lacoste was a nationally ranked ice hockey goaltender. At the World Hockey Cup, Lacoste was awarded the "Bästa Målvakt" or "Best Goaltender" Award in  Stockholm, Sweden. He also became the youngest goaltender to win a game in the  North American Hockey League (NAHL) at the age of 16 years, 3 months for the Alpena IceDiggers. Lacoste started his academic career at Boston College, however, ended up dropping out of school after his third semester. While at Boston College, Lacoste launched Jebbit with classmates Tom Coburn and Chase McAleese.

Jebbit
Lacoste's co-founder, Tom Coburn, received the initial inspiration for Jebbit in an airport as he observed a Hulu TV show on his laptop and realized how infrequently he paid attention to online advertising. Coburn began tinkering around with the idea on his own and eventually entered it into the Boston College Venture Competition under the working name, Additupp. After tying for first place, Coburn teamed up with Lacoste, and together they renamed the company Jebbit and built out a team of Boston College students before ultimately leaving school early. Jebbit customers have included Dell, eBay, Cathay Pacific, Volkswagen, NFL, Live Nation, Keurig, Harvard University and many more.

By mid-2013, Jebbit had raised more than $1.8 million of venture capital from firms such as Data Point Capital and Boston Seed Capital, as well as entrepreneurs including HubSpot Founder Dharmesh Shah and Acquia Founder Jay Batson. Jebbit was recognized by CNBC as one of the "Top 25 Most Promising Companies in the World" as part of Global Entrepreneurship Week in 2013. In addition, Jebbit has received industry awards at the Marketer's Choice Awards and by the Massachusetts Technology Leadership Council for innovation in the digital marketing and advertising industry.

Recognition

In 2013, Lacoste became one of the youngest entrepreneurs to ever receive funding from a venture capital firm, at the age of 19. In addition, Lacoste and the Jebbit team have been profiled in such publications and shows as Forbes, CNBC, The Boston Globe, The Boston Business Journal and others. Following his inclusion in the 2015 edition of Forbes 30 Under 30, Lacoste appeared on CNBC's Squawk Box to discuss Jebbit and the challenges of being a millennial entrepreneur.

Awards

Massachusetts "Emerging Executive of the Year" Award
Forbes 30 Under 30
Boston Globe's 25 Under 25

References

American marketing businesspeople
1993 births
Living people